Bouddi may refer to:

 Bouddi, New South Wales, a suburb of the Central Coast of New South Wales
 Bouddi National Park, located on the Central Coast of New South Wales